Action Records was a specialist soul record label. It replaced Island's Sue record label, formerly run by iconic mod DJ Guy Stevens. John Abbey started it in 1968, and Island Records distributed it.

57 singles and 12 LP's were issued as Action Records.

References

External links

Soul music record labels